The Nordstrom building in downtown Portland, Oregon, occupies a city block next to Pioneer Courthouse Square and houses a Nordstrom store.

Description and history
The building was completed in 1977. According to The Oregonian, the building's construction "helped kickstart a much-needed retail revitalization". In 2001, Parr Financial purchased the building from Portland CT Investment Inc. for $13.1 million plus $200,000 in other costs.

Garth Edwards' 1990 brushed stainless steel sculpture Urban Arrangements is attached to the east and west sides of the building. The artwork depicts abstract trees and branches, measures approximately 10 ft. x 15 ft. x 1/2 in., and was surveyed by the Smithsonian Institution's "Save Outdoor Sculpture!" program in 1993.

References

External links

 Nordstrom at Emporis

1977 establishments in Oregon
Buildings and structures in Portland, Oregon
Commercial buildings completed in 1977
Southwest Portland, Oregon